Sport in Spain in the second half of the 20th century has always been dominated by football. Other popular sport activities include basketball, tennis, cycling, handball, American football,  rally, motorcycling, judo, Formula One, water sports, rhythmic gymnastics, bullfighting, golf, and skiing.

Spain has also hosted a number of international events such as the 1992 Summer Olympics in Barcelona and the 1982 FIFA World Cup. With Rafael Nadal's Wimbledon championships in 2008 and 2010, US Open championships in 2010, 2013, 2017 and 2019, French Open championships in 2005–08, 2010–14, 2017–20 and 2022 and Australian Open in 2009 and 2022, the tennis team winning the Davis Cup five times (2000, 2005, 2008, 2009 and 2011), basketball team winning the 2006 World Basketball Championship and the 2019 World Basketball Championship, the FIBA EuroBasket in  2009, 2011, 2015 and 2022, and multiple medals at the Olympic Games, Fernando Alonso's back-to-back (2005 and 2006) Formula One championships, the football team bringing home Euro 2008, the 2010 FIFA World Cup and Euro 2012 trophies and Óscar Pereiro, Alberto Contador and Carlos Sastre's 2006, 2007, 2008 and 2009 triumphs in Tour de France more recently, several papers have looked beyond Sastre's win to claim that Spain is enjoying something of a sporting "Golden Age" similar to the Spanish 17th century achievements in painting and literature.

History

Administration and funding

School sport

Popularity
In 2014, the Centro de Investigaciones Sociológicas (CIS) asked which sport or sports people in Spain participated in and which ones they were particularly interested in, even if they did not practice them.
Allowing the respondent to give 3 answers to each question.

Host of events

Big events 
 1992 Summer Olympics in Barcelona
 1982 FIFA World Cup
 1999 World Athletics Championships in Seville

World Championships 
Olympic sports

Other sports

Spanish sports calendar 
Vuelta Ciclista a España
Volta a Catalunya
Euskal Herriko Itzulia (Tour of Basque Country)
Emakumeen Euskal Bira
Clásica de San Sebastián
Spanish Grand Prix
Rally de Catalunya

By Sport

Team sports

Football

Association football – commonly known as football (or soccer), – is the most popular sport in Spain. Football is a widespread passion among the people of Spain, and most people in Spain have at least some sort of connection to the sport. Football is the sport with the most registered players (a total of 1,063,090 of which 997,106 are men and 77,461 women), and highest number of registered clubs (a total of 29,205) among all Spanish sport federations according to data issued by the sports administration of Spain's government in 2020.

La Liga or Primera División (The Spanish League) is considered to be one of the world's best competitions. Successful teams in recent European competitions are Real Madrid, FC Barcelona, Sevilla, Athletic Bilbao, Valencia CF and Atlético Madrid. Real Madrid and Barcelona have dominated for much of their history, and created an intimate rivalry. Real Madrid has been dubbed by many pundits as the most successful club in the world, having won the UEFA Champions League a record 14 times, almost all other UEFA club competitions at least once, and La Liga a record 35 times. Barcelona has been European champions 5 times, and won La Liga on 26 occasions. Other teams such as Atlético Madrid, Sevilla and Valencia have also gained prominence by winning the UEFA Europa League, with 9 titles going to Spanish teams since 2004.

The Spain national team has been successful and has qualified for the FIFA World Cup tournament fifteen times since 1934. In 2010, Spain defeated the Netherlands in the final to win the tournament for the first time. In the European Championship they were champions in 1964, 2008 and 2012, and runners-up in 1984. Spain has won three medals in football Olympic Games tournaments. They have won two silver medals at the Sydney 2000 and at the Tokyo 2020 Olympic Games, and won a gold medal during the 1992 Barcelona Olympics.

The youth teams have also been quite successful in the last decade. The U-20 team won the FIFA World Youth Championship in 1999 and were runners-up in 1985 and 2003. The U-17 team was runners-up three times and won third place in 1997 in the FIFA U-17 World Cup.

Futsal 

The Spanish futsal league is divided into divisions.  The top teams play in the Primera División (also called Liga Nacional de Fútbol Sala). In each division, a team plays all other teams twice, once at home and once away.

The Spanish league teams compete in Europe under UEFA, most notably in the UEFA Futsal Cup with great success, being the national league holding more continental titles. The teams also compete in a domestic cup competition each year, called the Copa del Rey. The winner of the División de Honor plays against the winner of the Copa del Rey in the Supercopa de España (Super Cup).

The Spain national futsal team represents the whole country, and has twice won the World Championship and six times the UEFA Futsal Championship, which makes Spain the second international futsal power, after Brazil.

Basketball

The Spanish ACB is one of the major European basketball leagues. Spanish teams such as Real Madrid Baloncesto, FC Barcelona Bàsquet and Joventut Badalona have won international championships such as the Euroleague or Eurocup.

A number of Spanish players such as Pau Gasol and his younger brother Marc Gasol, Juan Hernangómez, Ricky Rubio, and naturalized Spaniard Serge Ibaka are currently playing in the NBA. Other Spanish players who have recently played in the league include Rudy Fernandez and Sergio Rodríguez.

The Spanish men's national basketball team has achieved a high ranked position in the international tournament by winning their first ever gold medal at the 2006 FIBA World Championship, and have hosted the 1986 FIBA World Championship and 2014 FIBA Basketball World Cup. also won six silver medals and four gold medals at the EuroBasket. Most recently, they won the gold medal at EuroBasket 2011, a silver at the 2012 Summer Olympics, a gold at EuroBasket 2015, a bronze at the 2016 Summer Olympics, a gold at the 2019 FIBA Basketball World Cup and another gold at EuroBasket 2022. The women's national team were silver medalists at the 2014 FIBA World Championship for Women (since renamed the FIBA Women's Basketball World Cup) and 2016 Olympics. They have also won nine medals (three gold, one silver, five bronze) at EuroBasket Women, most recently a gold in 2017. The country finished third in the FIBA Women's World Cup in 2018. The Spanish men's national basketball team ranked 1st in the FIBA ranking in September 2022, surpassing the United States for the first time ever, and as 2022 are the current World and European champions.

Handball

The Spanish Liga ASOBAL is one of the best club competitions. A number of Spanish teams such as BM Ciudad Real, FC Barcelona Handbol, and Portland San Antonio have won or were finalists in the EHF Champions League.

Since the 1990s the men's national team has won eight medals in top class international tournaments, with three bronze medals at the Olympics, three second and a third place at the European Championships and two World Championships (2005 and 2013).

Water polo
The Spain men's national water polo team is no stranger to the world's elite of this sport. The 1990s were a particularly successful decade for the Spanish team. Major achievements included a Silver medal at the 1992 Olympics and its greatest performance to date, winning the gold medal at the 1996 Olympics.

Other remarkable performances include winning the gold medal at the 1998 World Aquatics Championships and, again, at the 2001 edition. They also took Silver at the 2009 FINA World Championships in Rome. Before that, Spain had taken Silver at the 1991 edition and then again at the 1994 World Aquatics Championships.

Roller hockey (Quad)
Roller hockey (Quad) is played by professional athletes. The Spain national team has won the World Championship 14 times with 12 second places and 7 third places and also won the European Championship 14 times with 15 second places and 5 third places. The Spanish teams as FC Barcelona, Reus Deportiu, Igualada HC and HC Liceo La Coruña has won the European Clubs Cup in 44 editions, losing only in 7.

Beach volleyball
Spain featured national teams in beach volleyball that competed in the women's and men's section at the 2018–2020 CEV Beach Volleyball Continental Cup.

American Football 
The Liga Nacional de Fútbol Americano is the top level league in Spain and was first founded in 1988. It is divided into level of A,B,C, and regional divisions with A the top league.

Baseball and softball

Rugby union

Volleyball

Individual sports

Athletics
Athletics does not have a very high profile in Spain on a week-in week-out basis, but it leaps to prominence during major championships. 
Spanish Athletics Championships

Cycling

Cycling has been an important sport in Spain since the 1940s. The Vuelta a España (Spanish for "Tour of Spain") is one of the most important cycling events in the world, together with the Tour de France (French for "Tour of France") and Giro d'Italia (Italian for "Tour of Italy") stage races, collectively known as the Grand Tours.

Several Spanish cycling athletes have won the Tour de France, including Federico Bahamontes, Luis Ocaña, Pedro Delgado, Óscar Pereiro, Alberto Contador, and Carlos Sastre.
The most successful Spanish cyclist is Miguel Indurain. He won the Tour de France in five consecutive years between 1991 and 1995. He also won the Giro d'Italia in two consecutive years (1992 and 1993), the 1995 Road World Championship time trial and the gold medal in the 1996 Olympic time trial.

More recently, in 2008, Sastre became the seventh and third consecutive Spaniard to win the Tour de France, then followed by Contador winning his second tour in 2009's edition. Contador was thought to have repeated his win in 2010, but the day before Stage 17, the queen stage finishing with atop the Col du Tourmalet, Contador tested positive for performance-enhancing substance Clenbuterol. Although he claimed it was a result of consuming contaminated beef, in January 2012 the Court of Arbitration for Sport ruled him guilty and gave him a two-year ban backdated from July 21, 2010, and had all his results achieved after July 21 erased, including victory in the 2010 Giro d'Italia and a 5th-place finish and most aggressive rider award for stage 19 at the 2011 Tour de France. Since returning from the ban, Contador has won the Vuelta twice, in 2012 and 2014.

Óscar Freire shares the distinction of being one of four men to win the World Road Racing Championship three times, as well as being a three-time winner of one of the most prestigious one-day classic cycle races, the Milan–San Remo. Abraham Olano won the Vuelta a España in 1998, and is the only man to win World Championships in both the road race (1995) and time trial (1998). Alejandro Valverde was the winner of the 2009 Vuelta a España, has won the one-day classic Liège–Bastogne–Liège four times, and in 2018 became World Road Race Champion after having previously finished second or third six times.

Spain has also produced some notable mountain bikers like José Antonio Hermida and track racers like Olympic medalists Joan Llaneras, José Manuel Moreno Periñán, José Antonio Escuredo or Sergi Escobar as well as multi-world champion Guillermo Timoner.

Gymnastic

Artistic gymnastics

Rhythmic gymnastics

Rhythmic gymnastics is a popular sport through all Spain, so far the most successful individual rhythmic gymnasts are Carolina Pascual who won a silver medal in the individual all around competition in Barcelona 1992, Carmen Acedo who won gold medal in clubs competition in World Championships in 1993 and Almudena Cid this last is the only rhythmic gymnast who has competed at four olympic finals, placing 9th at Atlanta 1996 and Sydney 2000 being 8th at Athens 2004 and Beijing 2008.

In the Atlanta 1996 the Spanish team won the first gold medal of the new competition by groups. The Spanish team was formed by Estela Giménez, Marta Baldó, Nuria Cabanillas, Lorena Guréndez, Estíbaliz Martínez and Tania Lamarca.

Spain has found more success in the group competition than at the individual one, the country won many medals and gained prominence in the 90's which has its peak at the Centennial Olympic Games in Atlanta 1996, after the world championships at home in Seville 1998 the group went downhill and had inconsistent results until 2012 when they finished at the 4th place at the Olympic Games in 2012 London Olympics and a performance they would repeat at the 2013 World Championships in Kyiv where the Spanish group won the gold at the 10 clubs final and a bronze in the 3 balls + 2 ribbons final, their firsts world championships medals in 15 years, at the 2014 World Championships in Izmir, Turkey they retained their world title in the 10 clubs final. At the 2015 World Rhythmic Gymnastics Championships held in Stuttgart, Germany the group won the bronze medal at the all around competition, since 1998 the Spanish group hasn't won an all around medal.

Also for the first time in 9 years the country classified two gymnast for the individual all-around final, Natalia Garcia who finished in the 19th spot and Carolina Rodriguez who got the 11th place.

Triathlon

Tennis

Spain has produced a number of tennis champions, excelling in tournaments held on clay courts in particular, such as the French Open, the second Grand Slam tournament of the year.

Spain has won the Davis Cup six times (2000, 2004, 2008, 2009, 2011, 2019) and the Billie Jean King Cup (formerly Fed Cup) five times (1991, 1993, 1994, 1995, 1998).

Rafael Nadal is widely regarded as the greatest Spanish tennis player of all time and one of the best to ever play the game. He has won an all-time record of 22 Grand Slam men's singles titles, the most in tennis history. He has won the French Open a record 14 times. After defeating then-world No. 1 Roger Federer, Nadal claimed the Wimbledon title in a historic final in 2008. In 2009, he became the first Spaniard to win the Australian Open, he feat he repeated at the 2022 Australian Open. After defeating Novak Djokovic in the 2010 US Open final, he became the first man in history to win majors on clay, grass, and hard courts in a calendar year (Surface Slam), and the first Spaniard to complete a Career Grand Slam, having achieved it twice in his career thus far (one of four men to ever do so). In addition, Nadal is one of two men to achieve the Career Golden Slam in singles and a two-time Olympic gold medalist, having won the singles event at the 2008 Beijing Olympics and the doubles event at the 2016 Rio Olympics.

Spain has produced several other world No. 1 players such as Arantxa Sánchez Vicario in 1995 (a 3-time French Open champion in 1989, 1994, and 1998, and 1994 US Open champion), Carlos Moyá in 1999 (1998 French Open champion) Juan Carlos Ferrero in 2003 (2003 French Open champion) Garbiñe Muguruza in 2017 (2016 French Open and 2017 Wimbledon champion) and Carlos Alcaraz in 2022 (2022 US Open champion).

Other Grand Slam champions include Manuel Santana (1961 and 1964 French Open, 1966 Wimbledon, and 1965 US Open champion), Sergi Bruguera (1993 and 1994 French Open champion), Andrés Gimeno (1972 French Open champion), Conchita Martínez (1994 Wimbledon champion) and Albert Costa (2002 French Open champion).

Other notable Top 10 players from Spain include #2 Manuel Orantes, #2 Àlex Corretja, #2 Lilí Álvarez, #3 David Ferrer, #5 Tommy Robredo, #5 Manuel Alonso, #7 Juan Aguilera, #7 Emilio Sánchez, #7 Alberto Berasategui, #7 Fernando Verdasco, #10 Carlos Costa, and #10 Félix Mantilla.

Tournaments that are held in Spain on the men's ATP Tour every year are the Madrid Masters, Barcelona Open and Mallorca Open. The Madrid Masters are also part of the women's WTA Tour.

Motorsports

Auto racing 

In Formula One, the two world championships of Fernando Alonso in 2005 and 2006, helped to make more popular this sport in Spain, other notable Spanish drivers are Alfonso de Portago, Pedro de la Rosa and currently Carlos Sainz Jr. Also, Spain host the Spanish Grand Prix currently in Montmeló and previously the European Grand Prix in Jerez (1994, 1997) and Valencia (2008–2012).

In the World Rally Championship Spanish rally driver Carlos Sainz was crowned world champion in 1990 and 1992 and is ranked third with most wins with 26. Sainz retired from WRC in 2005 and switched to rally raid, where he won the 2010 Dakar Rally. Daniel Sordo has achieved best results since then by finishing third in the World Rally Championship in 2008 and 2009.

In endurance racing, Fermín Vélez is two-time 12 Hours of Sebring winner and two-time World Sportscar Championship Group C2 champion, Marc Gené won the 2009 24 Hours of Le Mans and 2010 12 Hours of Sebring, and Antonio García won the 2009 24 Hours of Daytona. Fernando Alonso won the 2018-2019 FIA WEC World Championship, taking wins at the 2018 and 2019 24 Hours of Le Mans. He also won the 2019 24 Hours of Daytona.

Motorcycle racing 

Spain host various Grand Prix motorcycle racing events as the Catalan motorcycle Grand Prix, the Spanish motorcycle Grand Prix, the Aragon motorcycle Grand Prix, and the Valencian Community motorcycle Grand Prix, these events have received high attendance numbers.

Spain have 4 world champions in the premier class of MotoGP: Àlex Crivillé (1999), Jorge Lorenzo (2010, 2012, 2015), Marc Márquez (2013, 2014, 2016, 2017, 2018, 2019) and Joan Mir (2020). There have also been Spanish riders who have won the Superbike World Championship: Carlos Checa in 2011 and Álvaro Bautista in 2022. 

Other notable Spanish grand prix motorcycling riders include Dani Pedrosa, Nicolás Terol, Emilio Alzamora, Jorge Martínez Aspar, Sete Gibernau, Sito Pons, and Ángel Nieto. Away from the track, Laia Sanz has won multiple women's world titles in motorcycle trials and enduro as well as several wins in the female class of the Dakar Rally. Ana Carrasco became the first female motorcyclist to win a world title when she became Supersport 300 World Champion in 2018.

Golf

Golf has become popular among the Spanish. There are a number of courses located in different parts of Spain. They include the San Roque, Sotogrande, Valderrama, and Alcaidesa. Spain hosted the 1997 Ryder Cup.

Spanish golfer Seve Ballesteros won the U.S. Masters Tournament twice, and the British Open three times. José María Olazábal has won two Masters titles. Jon Rahm won the U.S. Open in 2021, being the first Spaniard to do so and he also was World No.1 for several weeks in both amateur and professional rankings. Sergio García spent much of his career in the top 10 of the Official World Golf Rankings (over 250 weeks between 2000 and 2008) and won the 2017 Masters. In the women's game, Spain fielded the winning team in the inaugural International Crown in 2014.

Boxing

Combat Sports

Judo 
Spain has several judokas ranked in the top spots of the IJF ranking list, including Francisco Garrigós (#2 in -60kg), Alberto Gaitero (#7 in -66kg), Salvador Cases (#10 in -73kg) and Julia Figueroa (#3 in -48kg) in the senior category, and Gemma Maria Gómez (#6 in -48kg), Marina Castelló (#3 in -52kg), Marta García (#4 in -57kg), Laura Vázquez (#2 in -63kg) and Ai Tsunoda (#1 in -70kg and overall) in the junior category.

Karate 
Damián Quintero and Sandra Sánchez are currently ranked #2 and #3 respectively in their Kata categories, and are both Olympic medalists, with Sánchez being the gold medalist in the female kata and Quintero the silver medalist in male kata at the 2020 Olympics. In addition, Sánchez is a multiple European and World champion in kata, as so is Quintero.

Taekwondo

Water sports

Swimming

Synchronized swimming

During the 2000s, Spanish swimmer Gemma Mengual has heralded a series of both individual and team medals for Spain in all the major international synchronized swimming tournaments, including the silver medal at the Beijing 2008 Olympics. Mengual's coach, Ana Tarrés, who herself represented Spain in the sport at the 1984 Summer Olympics, also served as coach of the national team from 1997 to 2012: during her time in charge the team enjoyed great success, taking four Olympic medals, 26 World Championship medals, and 25 European Championship medals. Other Spanish synchronised swimmers to enjoy success in international competition since the emergence of Mengual include Paola Tirados, Andrea Fuentes, the most decorated swimmer in the history of the Spain national team, Ona Carbonell and Margalida Crespí.

Skiing
Skiing is a popular sport. In the past, this sport was under development for economic reasons. However the improvement of the economy of Spain, helped skiing become an active sport event. It has become popular, and the skiing sites have been modernized in recent years. In Spain the southernmost ski resort of Europe, Sierra Nevada, is located. Skiing is one of the favourite sports of the Spanish Royal Family.

Spain has enjoyed some success in competitive alpine skiing. Skiers who have won races in the Alpine Skiing World Cup include Carolina Ruiz Castillo, María José Rienda, and siblings Blanca and Francisco Fernández Ochoa. The Fernández Ochoas are the only Spanish athletes to have won medals at the Winter Olympics, with Francisco winning a gold medal in the men's slalom in the 1972 Winter Olympics and Blanca winning a bronze in the women's equivalent twenty years later.

Ski resorts in Spain

Sailing 
Royal Spanish Sailing Federation

Other sports

Basque pelota

Basque pelota

Beach football 
Spain national beach soccer team

Chess 

Linares International Chess Tournament

Trainera 
Kontxako Bandera

Valencian pelota
Valencian pilota is a traditional Valencian sports. Tournaments includes trinquete, Trofeu Individual Bancaixa, Circuit Bancaixa, raspall singles championship, and raspall team championship.

Major sports factilities

National stadia

Club football grounds 
The following is a list of stadiums with greater capacity.

Indoor arenas 
The following is a list of indoor arenas in Spain, ordered by capacity.

Athletics stadiums

Club rugby grounds

Other grounds

Motosports circuits

Velodromes

Golf courses

Ski resort 

Alpine skiing

Nordic skiing

See also
 Spanish Badminton Federation

Notes

References

External links
 Spanish Sport Guide.
 Sport in Madrid.
 Sports in Spain.